Manasota is an unincorporated community in Sarasota County, Florida, United States, located on the mainland south of Venice. The Manasota Bridge (County Road 774) crosses Lemon Bay (Gulf Intracoastal Waterway), connecting Manasota to Manasota Beach and Manasota Key.  It is home to a United States Postal Service processing and distribution center for Manatee and Sarasota counties.

References

Unincorporated communities in Sarasota County, Florida
Populated places on the Intracoastal Waterway in Florida
Unincorporated communities in Florida